Elizabeth Phillips may refer to:

Elizabeth Phillips (martial artist) (born 1986), American mixed martial artist
Elizabeth Phillips (Stó:lō Nation elder) (born 1939), Canadian tribal leader
Elizabeth D. Phillips (1945–2017), American academic administrator

See Also
Eliza Phillips (1823–1916), English activist